The 2nd All-Africa Games – Lagos 1973 were played from January 7, 1973, to January 18, 1973, in Lagos, Nigeria.

After the success of the first African Games, the organizing bodies awarded the second games to Bamako, Mali to be held in 1969. A military coup disrupted the plans and the organizers moved the games to Lagos, Nigeria to be held in 1971. The games were postponed once again and finally opened in January 1973. A torch was lit in Brazzaville a week before the games and transported to Lagos as a symbol of the continuity of the games.

Security again was very tight at the games. This time in response to the massacre of Israeli athletes at the Munich Olympic Games just four short months before.

Sports heroes from around the world including Abebe Bikila, Pelé, Muhammad Ali, and Jesse Owens were invited to attend the opening ceremonies.

Ben Jipcho, Kenya's 3000 meter silver medalist at the Munich Olympics, tied the world record in the steeplechase with a run of 8:20.8. Tanzania's newcomer Filbert Bayi stunned the veteran favorite Kip Keino in the 1500 meters in 3:37.18.

African nations continued to put pressure on South Africa which was not invited to participate due to their apartheid policies. Rhodesia was also not invited.

At the closing ceremonies the torch was passed to Algiers, Algeria to begin preparations for the IIIrd All-Africa Games in 1978.

Medal table

Athletics 

Only one athlete defended his title from the 1965 Games, namely Malian discus thrower Namakoro Niaré. Three athletes, one male and two female, won more than one event:

Ohene Karikari, Ghana (100 metres and 200 metres men)
Alice Annum, Ghana (100 metres and 200 metres women)
Modupe Oshikoya, Nigeria (high jump, long jump and 100m hurdles)
Adegboyega Sunday Olorife, Nigeria (Youngest athlete to represent Nigeria at age 15 in 1973, known for his impressive performance in the water polo, and backstroke events)

Several women's events was added. These were 200 metres, 400 metres, 800 metres, 1500 metres, discus throw, shot put and 4 x 400 metres relay.

Nagui Asaad won his first Gold  medal in Shot Put of the All Africa Games, 1973, Nigeria, and then he went to win a second time in 1978, Algeria, He also was the Silver medallist in Discus throw of the All Africa Games, 1973

Soccer 

The soccer tournament was won by the host country Nigeria.

External links
Athletics results - gbrathletics.com

References

 
All-Africa Games
All-Africa Games
All-Africa Games
African Games
International sports competitions in Lagos
Multi-sport events in Nigeria
20th century in Lagos
1973 in multi-sport events
January 1973 sports events in Africa